The Simonini Mini 2 Plus is an Italian aircraft engine, designed and produced by Simonini Racing of San Dalmazio di Serramazzoni for use in ultralight aircraft.

Design and development
The Mini 2 Plus is a single cylinder two-stroke, air-cooled, gasoline engine design, with a poly V belt reduction drive with reduction ratios of 2.3:1 and 2.4:1. It employs capacitor discharge ignition and produces  at 7200 rpm.

Applications
AEF Monotrace
Dynamic Sport Climber
Paraavis Vityaz
Sperwill 2+
Time To Fly Backplane SL
Walkerjet Simon

Specifications (Mini 2 Plus)

See also

References

External links

Air-cooled aircraft piston engines
Simonini aircraft engines
Two-stroke aircraft piston engines